Jungle Funk is the eponymously titled debut album of Jungle Funk, released in 1998 by ESC Records. Capturing a live collaboration between musicians Will Calhoun, Vinx de Jon Parette and Doug Wimbish, the material comprising the album was recorded over the course of two days in April 1998 at Conrad Sohm, Austria. It combined the hard funk of Living Colour with the more technology based sampling approach of Tackhead.

Track listing

Personnel 

Jungle Funk
Will Calhoun – drums, percussion, loops
Vinx De'Jon Parrette – vocals, sampler, percussion, loops
Doug Wimbish – bass guitar, loops, vocals, producer, mixing
Additional musicians
Darren Grant – backing vocals (3)
Green Tea – keyboards and programming (8)
Pete Holdsworth – keyboards and programming (8)
Keith LeBlanc – loops (5), drums and percussion (3)
Skip McDonald – vocals and guitar (3)
Professor Stretch – keyboards and programming (8)

Technical personnel
Cedric Beatty – engineering
Jungle Funk – producer
Matt Hathaway – engineering (3)
Ted Jensen – mastering

Release history

References

External links 
 

1998 live albums
1998 debut albums
Live albums by American artists